Robert Keller (1828-1891) was a German music editor.

Keller was born on 6 January 1828 in Harpersdorf in Lower Silesia. He moved to Berlin where he became a musical editor for the music publishing company N. Simrock.  Keller edited and arranged a substantial number of works by Johannes Brahms and Antonín Dvořák. He died in Berlin on 16 June 1891.

References 

 

Sheet music publishers (people)
German music publishers (people)
1828 births
1891 deaths